The Balz–Schiemann reaction (also called the Schiemann reaction) is a chemical reaction in which a primary aromatic amine is transformed to an aryl fluoride via a diazonium tetrafluoroborate intermediate. This reaction is a traditional route to fluorobenzene and some related derivatives, including 4-fluorobenzoic acid.

The reaction is conceptually similar to the Sandmeyer reaction, which converts diazonium salts to other aryl halides (ArCl, ArBr).  However, while the Sandmeyer reaction involves a copper reagent/catalyst and radical intermediates, the thermal decomposition of the diazonium tetrafluoroborate proceeds without a promoter and is believed to generate highly unstable aryl cations (Ar+), which abstract F− from BF4− to give the fluoroarene (ArF), along with boron trifluoride as the byproduct.

Innovations
The traditional Balz–Schiemann reaction employs HBF4 and involves isolation of the diazonium salt. Both aspects can be profitably modified. Other counterions have been used in place of tetrafluoroborates, such as hexafluorophosphates (PF6−) and hexafluoroantimonates (SbF6−) with improved yields for some substrates. The diazotization reaction can be effected with nitrosonium salts such as [NO]SbF6 without isolation of the diazonium intermediate.

History
The reaction is named after the German chemists  and Günther Balz.

Additional literature

References

Halogenation reactions
Substitution reactions
Name reactions